Ivan Naydenov (born 26 October 1981) is a former Bulgarian footballer and currently the manager of FC Topoli.

References

1981 births
Living people
Bulgarian footballers
First Professional Football League (Bulgaria) players
Cypriot Second Division players
PFC Slavia Sofia players
PFC Spartak Varna players
Expatriate footballers in Cyprus
ASIL Lysi players

Association football midfielders